Cherkasy Oblast, also referred to as Cherkashchyna is an oblast (province) in central Ukraine located along the Dnieper River. The administrative center of the oblast is the city of Cherkasy. The current population of the oblast is

Geography

With 20,900 km², Cherkasy Oblast is the 18th largest oblast of Ukraine, comprising about 3.5% of the area of the country. The south flowing Dnieper River with the hilly western bank and the plain eastern bank divides the oblast into two unequal parts.  The larger western part belongs to the Dnieper Upland. The low-lying eastern part of the oblast used to be subject to the frequent Dnieper flooding before the flow of the river became controlled by multiple dams of Hydroelectric Power Plants constructed along the river in the 20th century.

The oblast extends for 245 km from south-west to north-east, and for 150 km from north to south. The northernmost point of the oblast is located is near the village of Kononivka in Zolotonosha Raion (district), the southernmost point near the village of Kolodyste in Zvenyhorodka Raion, the westernmost point near the village of Korytnya in Uman Raion, and the easternmost point near the village of Stetsivka in Cherkasy Raion.  The geometric centre of the oblast is located near the village Zhuravky of Horodyshche Raion. The oblast borders Kyiv Oblast to the north, Kirovohrad Oblast to the south, Poltava Oblast to the east, and Vinnytsia Oblast to the west.

History

Cherkasy Oblast was created as part of the Ukrainian Soviet Socialist Republic on 7 January 1954. The oblast's territory was the major cities of Cherkasy, Smila and Uman, their corresponding raions (districts), as well as 30 former raions of the Vinnytsia, Kyiv, Kirovohrad and Poltava Oblasts.

Archaeological discoveries have shown that people have inhabited the valley of the Dnieper River since time immemorial. The oldest objects excavated on the territory of the region date back to the Stone Age – the Palaeolithic period.

Administrative divisions
Since July 2020, Cherkasy Oblast is administratively subdivided into 4 raions (districts). There are a total of 16 cities, 15 urban-type settlements, and 824 villages.

The following data incorporates the number of each type of administrative divisions of Cherkasy Oblast:

 Administrative Center—1 (Cherkasy);
 Raions—4;
 Settlements—855, including:
 Villages—824;
 Urban localities—31, including:
 Urban-type settlements—15;
 Cities—16;
 Rural councils—525.

The local administration of the oblast is controlled by the Cherkasy Oblast Rada. The governor of the oblast is the Cherkasy Oblast Rada speaker, appointed by the President of Ukraine.

Since July 2020, Cherkasy Oblast consists of four raions:
 Cherkasy Raion;
 Uman Raion;
 Zolotonosha Raion;
 Zvenyhorodka Raion.

The region has 16 populated places designated as cities (towns). The only one with the population over 100 thousands is Cherkasy. Uman and Smila are in the range between 80 and 90 thousands, and all others are below 30 thousands.

Demographics

The current estimated population is 1,335,064 (as of 2006).

According to the 2001 Ukrainian census, the oblast's population is almost equally divided between the urban and rural areas (53.7% and 46.3%, respectively). The demographic situation in this largely agricultural territory is somewhat complicated by population ageing.

By ethnic composition, Ukrainians represent the overwhelming majority of the oblast's population (73.6%). Ethnic Russians are the second group of population (25.4%), and are concentrated mainly in the city of Cherkasy.

Age structure
 0-14 years: 13.4%  (male 87,557/female 82,340)
 15-64 years: 69.1%  (male 417,426/female 457,390)
 65 years and over: 17.5%  (male 72,835/female 147,711) (2013 official)

Median age
 total: 41.7 years 
 male: 38.4 years 
 female: 45.0 years  (2013 official)

Economy

The economy of the Cherkasy Oblast is largely dominated by agriculture. While the winter wheat and sugar beets are the main products grown in the oblast, barley, corn, tobacco and hemp are also grown.  Cattle breeding is also important.

The industry is mainly concentrated in Cherkasy, the oblast's capital and the largest city. A chemical industry was developed in the city in late 1960s in addition to machine building, furniture making and agricultural processing.

Nomenclature

Most of Ukraine's oblasts are named after their capital cities, officially referred to as "oblast centers". The name of each oblast is a relative adjective, formed by adding a feminine suffix to the name of respective center city: Cherkasy is the center of  the Cherkaska oblast (Cherkasy Oblast). Most oblasts are also sometimes referred to in a feminine noun form, following the convention of traditional regional place names, ending with the suffix "-shchyna", as is the case with the Cherkasy Oblast, Cherkashchyna.

Education
There are 5 universities in the region:
 The Bohdan Khmelnytsky National University of Cherkasy
 Cherkasy State Technological University 
 Uman National University Of Horticulture
  Pavlo Tychyna Uman State Pedagogical University
 East European University of Economics and Management (private)

Attractions
Sofiivka
Fatherland of Taras Shevchenko
Trypillian culture
Shevchenko National preserve
Martynivka Treasure housed in Kyiv

See also
 Administrative divisions of Ukraine
 Right and Left-bank Ukraine, historical region

References

 
 (1972) Історіа міст і сіл Української CCP - Черкаська область (History of Towns and Villages of the Ukrainian SSR - Cherkasy Oblast), Kyiv.

External links

 oda.ck.ua—Official website of Cherkasy Oblast Administration 
 ukrainebiz.com—Cherkasy oblast: facts and figures

 
Oblasts of Ukraine
States and territories established in 1954
1954 establishments in Ukraine